North Dakota Highway 27 (ND 27) is a  east–west state highway in the U.S. state of North Dakota. ND 27's western terminus is at ND 1 north of Verona, and the eastern terminus is at ND 18 north of Wyndmere.

Major intersections

References

027
Transportation in LaMoure County, North Dakota
Transportation in Ransom County, North Dakota
Transportation in Richland County, North Dakota